This page details first-grade rugby league records from the National Rugby League (1998-) and its predecessors, the New South Wales Rugby Football League (1908-1994), the Australian Rugby League, (1995-1997), and the Super League (1997). First-grade games played between premiership teams are included, but not mid-week competitions, pre-season warm-up games or NRL Nines games.

Team records

Premierships

Most consecutive
11 -  St. George (1956 to 1966)

Minor Premierships

Most consecutive
6 -  St. George (1962 to 1967)

Runners-up

Most consecutive
3 -  Western Suburbs Magpies (1961 to 1963)

Wooden spoons

 Due to salary cap breaches Canterbury were deducted 37 competition points and relegated to the bottom of the ladder for the 2002 season.
Due to salary cap breaches Melbourne weren't able to receive any points in the 2010 season guaranteeing them the wooden spoon.

Most consecutive
6 -  Parramatta Eels (1956 to 1961)

Team wins, losses, win percentage and draws

Matches played 

Source: Rugby League Tables & Statistics. Last updated: 19 March 2023

Most consecutive wins

Most consecutive losses

Result records

Greatest win margins

Most points scored in a game

Fewest points scored in a game

Most points scored by one team in a game

Highest scores by a losing side

Highest drawn games scores

Best start to a season

Undefeated in a season

Failed to win a match in a season

Most points scored by a team in a season

 839 points by the  Parramatta Eels in 2001.

Most tries and goals by a team in a Grand Final
8 tries, 9 goals by  South Sydney in 1951.

Largest winning margin in a Grand Final
40 points to nil by the  Manly Warringah Sea Eagles over the  Melbourne Storm in 2008.

Fewest points scored by a team in a season
38 points by  Cumberland in 1908.

Most points conceded by a team in a season
944 points by the  Western Suburbs Magpies in 1999.

Fewest points conceded by a team in a season
41 points by  South Sydney in 1909.

Keeping opposition scoreless: most games in a season 
6 matches by the  Sydney Roosters in 2013.

Biggest comebacks

Individual records 
Note: Figures in boldface are currently playing in the NRL.

Most games played

At one club

Most tries scored

In a career

In a season

In a game

8 - Frank Burge,  Glebe vs.  University, Round 7, 1920

Most points scored

In a career

In a season

In a game

45 - Dave Brown,  Eastern Suburbs vs.  Canterbury-Bankstown, Round 6, 1935

Oldest players

Youngest players

Most games coached

Oldest coaches

See also

List of players who have played 300 NRL games
List of players with 1,000 NRL points
List of players with 20 NRL field goals
List of players with 100 NRL tries
List of players with 100 NRL tries and 500 NRL goals
List of players with 500 NRL goals
State of Origin results and statistics
List of NRL Under-20s records
List of NRL Women's Premiership records

References

 The 2006 Official Rugby League Annual, compiled by David Middleton

External links
National Rugby League official site
Rugby League Tables

Records
Records
Rugby league records and statistics
Australian records